Roti canai or roti prata, also known as roti chanai and roti cane, is a flatbread dish found in several countries in Southeast Asia, especially in Brunei, Indonesia, Malaysia, Singapore and Thailand. It is usually served with dal or other types of curry, but can also be cooked in a range of sweet or savoury variations made with a variety of ingredients such as meat, eggs, or cheese.

Introduced around the 19th century, roti canai has become a popular breakfast and snack dish especially in the Southeast Asian countries of Brunei, Indonesia, Malaysia, Singapore and Thailand. It is said that the dish was brought by Indians during the era of British Malaya, the Dutch East Indies and the Straits Settlements. They are also colloquially known as "mamak", and are served in street mamak stalls located in both rural and urban Brunei, Indonesia, Malaysia and Thailand as well as within hawker centres in Singapore. 

It has also been theorized that the dish had also been introduced much earlier in the 17th century in Aceh and North Sumatra by Indian traders under the name roti cane. In Indonesia, the dish is particularly found in Sumatra, where the Indian Indonesian community is more prominent compared to the rest of the country.

Etymology
Roti means bread in Sanskrit, and most other Indian languages. There are different suggestions for the origin of canai: it has been claimed that canai refers to channa, a Northern Indian dish made with boiled chickpeas in a spicy gravy, with which this type of bread was traditionally served. However, The Oxford English Dictionary, states that it came from the Malay word canai, meaning "to roll (dough) thinly". 

In Singapore, the dish is known as roti prata, similar to the Indian paratha or parotta. The Hindi word paratha means "flat".

Description

Roti canai is made from dough which is usually composed of fat (usually ghee), flour and water; some recipes also include sweetened condensed milk. The dough is repeatedly kneaded, flattened, oiled, and folded before proofing, creating layers. The dough ball is then flattened, spread out until paper thin (usually by "tossing" it on a flat surface), and gathered into a long rope-like mass. This "rope" is then wound into a knot or spiral and flattened, so that it consists of thin flakes of dough when cooked.
Up until the 1970s, it was common for cooks to form a spiral with the "rope" (much like the modern "roti bomb"), but this is no longer the case, probably because the amount of dough used per roti is about half of what it used to be. When making varieties with fillings, however, the fillings (eggs, chopped onions, etc.) are spread or sprinkled on the thin sheet of dough, which is then folded with the fillings inside.

Regional variations

Plain roti is often referred to as roti kosong ("empty bread" in Malay language). 

Traditionally, roti canai is served with dal (lentil) curry. It may also be served with the following curries:

 Kari ayam, chicken curry
 Kari daging, beef curry
 Kari kambing, mutton curry
 Kari ikan, fish curry (mostly served with ikan pari)
 Kari campur, mixed curry
 Kari kacang kuda, a chickpea curry.

Indonesia

Roti cane came into Indonesia via the influx of Muslim Indian migration to Aceh Sultanate in northern parts of Sumatra around the 17th century, and later to the rest of Dutch East Indies in the early 19th century. Roti canai is more prevalent in Sumatra, especially in Aceh, North and West Sumatra. Roti cane has been adopted by the Malay cuisine of Sumatra, Acehnese cuisine and Minangkabau cuisine. Consequently, there are Malay, Aceh, and Minangkabau restaurants that serve roti canai with mutton curry in Indonesia that are operated by ethnic groups other than Indians.

In Ampel, an Arab quarter in Surabaya, it is known as roti maryam, while common Javanese called it roti konde after its similar shape to a hairbun (Javanese: konde). Despite having different names, each variant is derivative of the Indian paratha and are similar in preparation. Indian-influence roti is typically served with kari kambing (mutton curry).

Brunei and Malaysia 

Different varieties of roti canai served in Brunei and Malaysia are listed below: 

 Murtabak, a very thick roti filled with a mixture of egg, meat, onions and spices. In Brunei, Malaysia and Singapore it is usually prepared on a griddle like roti canai, but in Indonesia, it is often deep-fried in a wok and very oily. In Thailand, it is called "mataba". In Malaysia, Singapore and Thailand, murtabak is made using the same dough used to make roti canai, and on the same equipment in the same shops. Most murtabak in Malaysia tend to have less minced meat and more egg than Singaporean murtabak or Johorean murtabak. Murtabak cheese is a variation with added mozzarella cheese.
 Roti telur, with an egg (telur) stuffing.
 Roti jantan, roti telur with two-egg stuffing.
 Roti bawang, with onions (bawang) stuffing.
 Roti telur bawang, with eggs (telur) and onions (bawang) stuffing.
 Roti boom (or bom; 'bomb bread'), a smaller but thicker roti, with the dough wound in a spiral. Served sweet, with sugar, and with margarine, or served with curry. 
 Roti planta, stuffed with margarine (often Planta Margarine) and sugar.
 Roti sardin, stuffed with canned sardine with or without egg and sometimes mixed with ketchup or sambal, similar to murtabak
 Roti pisang, stuffed with sliced bananas.
 Roti sayur. stuffed with shredded or sliced vegetables.
 Roti salad, raw shredded vegetables rolled up with a piece of roti.
 Roti tissue/roti tisu, a tissue-paper-thin and flaky roti, usually with sprinkled sugar and condensed milk. Also called roomali roti, from roomal (Hindi, meaning 'handkerchief').
 Roti kaya, with kaya spread.

 Roti maggi, stuffed with prepared instant noodles, usually Maggi brand.
 Roti cheese, stuffed with cheese.
 Roti milo, stuffed with Milo powder
 Roti cobra, a roti served with curry chicken and piece of fried egg on top. 
 Roti banjir ("flooded roti"), roti, usually chopped into pieces, with much curry poured over the top.
 Roti tsunami ("tsunami roti"), roti banjir with added sambal and soft-boiled eggs.
 Roti Doll ("Doll's roti"), roti banjir with added sambal and a fried egg on top. Most commonly found in the northern Peninsula, especially in the town of Alor Setar. Named after a customer. 
 Roti Sarang Burung ("bird's nest roti"), roti cooked in doughnut shape with a fried egg in the hole, Similar to egg in the basket and khachapuri.

Singapore 

Roti prata in Singapore is a fried flatbread that is cooked over a flat grilling pan. It is usually served with sugar or a vegetable- or meat-based curry and is also commonly cooked with cheese, onions, bananas, red beans, chocolate, mushrooms or eggs.

Roti prata is prepared by flipping the dough into a large thin layer before folding the outside edges inwards. The dough is cooked on a flat round iron pan measuring about three feet in diameter. The cooking process lasts two to five minutes.

 Roti tampal or Roti plaster (in Singapore), roti is plastered on one side with egg with the yolk left runny or totally cooked.

Thailand

In Thailand, roti (with variations on spelling such as ro tee) is commonly sold from street carts, usually halal sold by Thai Muslims. Roti thitchu (Thai for "tissue") is Thai roti canai that is fluffed up by clapping it between two hands inside a dry cloth after frying, served with a Thai-Muslim style beef curry.

In other parts of Thailand, roti is also commonly eaten with mango, banana, sugar, condensed milk, jam, peanut butter and Nutella roti, although egg roti is also available.

Gallery

See also 

 Crêpe
 Goat roti
 Kerala Porotta
Khachapuri
 Mamak stall
 Roti jala
 Naan
 Paratha
 Roti

References

External links 

 Roti Prata Video Recipe
 Roti Prata, Singapore Infopedia, National Library Board, Singapore

Acehnese cuisine
Cuisine of Pakistani diaspora
Culture of Indian diaspora
Desi cuisine
Flatbreads
Indian diaspora in Singapore
Indonesian breads
Indonesian pancakes
Javanese cuisine
Malay cuisine
Malaysian breads
National dishes
Padang cuisine
Pancakes
Roti
Singaporean cuisine
Thai cuisine
Bruneian cuisine
Unleavened breads